Cooperation between China and Central and Eastern European Countries (China-CEE, China-CEEC, also 14+1; formerly 17+1 from 2019 to 2021 and 16+1 from 2021 to 2022) is an initiative by the Chinese Ministry of Foreign Affairs to promote business and investment relations between China and 14 countries of Central and Eastern Europe (CEE, CEEC): Albania, Bosnia and Herzegovina, Bulgaria, Croatia, the Czech Republic, Greece, Hungary, Montenegro, North Macedonia, Poland, Romania, Serbia, Slovakia and Slovenia.

Format
The format was founded in 2012 in Budapest to push for cooperation of the "16+1" (the 16 CEE countries and PRC). In 2019 at Dubrovnik Summit Greece joined the grouping, while in 2021 Lithuania left it. The 16+1 meet annually; summits were held in Dubrovnik (2019), Sofia (2018), Budapest (2017), Riga (2016), Suzhou (2015), Belgrade (2014), Bucharest (2013) and Warsaw (2012). The China-CEE secretariat is in Beijing, with 16 "national coordinators" in each of the partner CEE countries.

The format's goals are to promote the Chinese Belt and Road Initiative and enhance cooperation in the fields of infrastructure, transportation and logistics, trade and investment". These goals are supported by "growing ties in the areas of culture, education and tourism ... cultural exchanges, think tanks and NGOs."

Summit

Enlargement

Greece
In 2019 summit (Dubrovnik), Greece, previously an observer, became a full member of the mechanism.

Withdrawals

Lithuania
In March 2021, the Lithuanian National Radio and Television (LRT) reported that in February, the Lithuanian parliament agreed to leave what was previously China's 17+1 format. Foreign minister Gabrielius Landsbergis said the cooperation between Beijing and Lithuania has brought "almost no benefits". At the same time, it was also reported that Lithuania would open a trade representative office in Taiwan, formally known as the Republic of China (ROC), to boost unofficial relations with Taipei.

The incident led to a diplomatic row with China and further trade disputes, including Chinese boycotts of Lithuanian components, dragging the European Union into the dispute. Lithuanian President Gitanas Nausėda stated in January 2022 that it was a mistake in allowing Taiwan to open a representative office under the 'Taiwan' name, and that he was not consulted on the decision. Furthermore, a January 2022 poll commissioned by the Lithuanian Ministry of Foreign Affairs found that a large majority of Lithuanian citizens are critical of current government policy towards China, leading to opposition figures calling for the repair of bilateral relations. A poll that was conducted soon after the 2022 Russian invasion of Ukraine showed that 20% of Lithuanian respondents viewed China very negatively and 44% rather negatively, indicating that the war may have had an impact.

Estonia and Latvia
On 11 August 2022, Estonia and Latvia stepped out of the format.

Infrastructure, investment and trade
This includes (as of 2017) Serbia's E763 Highway project, the Budapest–Belgrade railway and the China–Europe Land–Sea Express Route. In Croatia, a Chinese consortium led by China Road and Bridge Corporation (CRBC) was contracted for the first phase of the construction of Pelješac Bridge and its access roads. In Poland, Chinese companies acquired Huta Stalowa Wola's civil engineering machinery division and Poland's PBF bearings.

According to China Customs' statistics, China's trade volume with CEEC totaled $67.98 billion in 2017, a 15.9 percent increase compared to that of 2016. According to the Chinese Ministry of Commerce, in 2016 China-CEE trade increased to $58.7 billion (from $43.9 billion in 2010), while its investment in CEE countries has accumulated to more than $8 billion, covering industries such as machinery, chemical, telecom and new energy.

Cultural links
From 2012 to 2017 six new direct flight routes between China and CEEC have been opened, the number of Chinese tourists visiting CEEC increased from 280,000 to 930,000, and the number of exchange students doubled as well[provide figures]. A China-CEEC Coordination Center for Cultural Cooperation was opened in North Macedonia. In China, the China-CEEC training center for young artists and China-CEEC Cultural and Creative Industries Exchanges and Cooperation Center were opened in the southwestern city of Chengdu.

Reaction
Attributed as a ‘win–win’ cooperation for China, the countries involved, and the European Union (EU), Jeremy Garlick, a British assistant professor at the Prague University of Economics and Business, accused China as pursuing an assertive strategy of ‘divide and conquer’ tactics designed to benefit China at the EU's expense.

See also 

 Belt and Road Initiative
 Northern Future Forum
 Three Seas Initiative

References

Publications 
 Weiqing Song (eds.),China's Relations with Central and Eastern Europe: From "Old Comrades" to New Partners, Routledge, October 2017.
 Anastas Vangeli, Central and Eastern Europe as a New Frontier of China's Multilateral Diplomacy, Guest Editor: Dragan Pavlićević, Global China and Symbolic Power: The Case of 16 + 1 Cooperation, Journal of Contemporary China, 11 April 11, 2018, https://doi.org/10.1080/10670564.2018.1458056
 Anastas Vangeli, China's Engagement with the Sixteen Countries of Central, East and Southeast Europe under the Belt and Road Initiative, 19 September 2017, https://doi.org/10.1111/cwe.12216, in: China & World Economy, Volume 25, Issue 5, Special Issue: Eurasian Perspectives on China's Belt and Road Initiative, September–October 2017, pp. 101–124.
 Jean-Paul Larçon (eds.), The New Silk Road: China Meets Europe in the Baltic Sea Region – A Business Perspective, HEC Paris, France, World Scientific, July 2017
 Radu Sava, Romanian rhetoric on China's 16+1. Diffraction of politics and economics in Studia Universitatis Babes-Bolyai 1/2019, pp. 132–155.
Emilian Kavalski, China's "16+1" Is Dead? Long Live the "17+1.", The Diplomat, March 29, 2019.
Ivana Karaskova, Engaging China in 17+1: Time for the ACT Strategy, The Diplomat, April 7, 2020.
Keegan Elmer, Europe's '17+1' countries dissatisfied with China relations, report says, as summit is postponed, South China Morning Post, April 7, 2020.

External links
 Cooperation between China and Central and Eastern European Countries official website
in English: 
and Chinese: 

Foreign relations of China
Chinese economic policy
Eastern Europe